Propel Water is an American brand of flavored bottled water that is advertised for having antioxidants and vitamins. It is a beverage product of Gatorade and is marketed by PepsiCo.

Ingredients
The water often contains, along with water, citric acid, sodium hexametaphosphate, natural flavor, potassium sorbate, ascorbic acid (vitamin C), sucralose, sodium citrate, potassium citrate, acesulfame potassium, niacinamide (vitamin B3), Calcium disodium EDTA, vitamin E acetate, calcium pantothenate (vitamin B5), and pyridoxine hydrochloride (vitamin B6)

History
Propel Fitness Water was introduced in 2000 by PepsiCo. In January 2006, Gatorade introduced Propel Calcium. In the summer of 2006, Gatorade introduced Propel powder packets; a dry powder mix of Propel, where the contents of a powder packet are added to a 500 mL (16.9 oz) bottle of water.  Propel powder with Calcium launched in January 2010.
In early 2009, Gatorade changed the bottle design.  The packaging claims that the bottles contain 20% less plastic than their predecessors.

In early 2011, Gatorade announced it was discontinuing production of regular Propel (Sucrose & artificial sweeteners base), in favor of an artificially sweetened variety: "Propel Zero".

References

External links
Official website

Non-alcoholic drinks
Sports drinks
Products introduced in 2000
Bottled water brands
Gatorade